Michael Francis Parsons (1928–2021) was a civil engineer who designed major elements of large suspension bridges including the Severn Bridge; Forth Road Bridge; Humber Bridge and Bosphorus Bridges.

References

1928 births
2021 deaths
Alumni of the University of Bristol
British bridge engineers